5-Androstenedione, also known as androst-5-ene-3,17-dione, is a prohormone of testosterone. The World Anti-Doping Agency prohibits its use in athletes. In the United States, it is a controlled substance.
 
5-Androstenedione is structurally similar to 4-androstenedione, with the exception of the position of a carbon-carbon double bond. 4-Androstenedione is naturally produced in the body by the adrenal glands and gonads. In addition to testosterone, it is also a precursor of estrone and estradiol.

5-Androstenedione is on the World Anti-Doping Agency's list of prohibited substances, and is therefore banned from use in most major sports.

References

External links
 5-Androstenedione

Androgens and anabolic steroids
Androstanes
Diketones
Pregnane X receptor agonists
World Anti-Doping Agency prohibited substances